The lesser occipital nerve or small occipital nerve is a cutaneous spinal nerve. It arises from second cervical (spinal) nerve (along with the greater occipital nerve). It innervates the scalp in the lateral area of the head posterior to the ear.

Structure 
The lesser occipital nerve is one of the four cutaneous branches of the cervical plexus.

Origin 
It arises from the (lateral branch of the ventral ramus) of cervical spinal nerve C2; it may also receive fibres from cervical spinal nerve C3. It originates between the atlas, and axis.

Course and relations 
It curves around the accessory nerve (CN XI) to come to course anterior to it. It then curves around and ascends along the posterior border of the sternocleidomastoid muscle; rarely, it may pierce the muscle. Near the cranium, it perforates the deep fascia. It is continues upwards along the scalp posterior to the auricle.

Distribution 
The lesser occipital nerve distributes branches to the skin. It gives off an auricular branch, which supplies the skin of the upper and back part of the auricula, communicating with the mastoid branch of the great auricular. This branch is occasionally derived from the greater occipital nerve.

Variation 
Rarely, the lesser occipital nerve may be duplicated or triplicated. It varies in size.

Function 
The lesser occipital nerve supplies part of the scalp near the auricle. It connects with the great auricular nerve, the greater occipital nerve, and the auricular branch of the facial nerve.

Clinical significance 
Problems with the lesser occipital nerve cause occipital neuralgia. Nerve block is difficult due to variation in the course of the nerve.

History 
The lesser occipital nerve may also be known as the occipitalis minor nerve, or the small occipital nerve.

Additional images

References

External links 
 
 http://www.dartmouth.edu/~humananatomy/figures/chapter_47/47-2.HTM
 http://www.dartmouth.edu/~humananatomy/figures/chapter_47/47-6.HTM

Optic nerve